This page is a list of all the matches that Portugal national football team has played between 1921 and 1939. Between their first match in 1921 and 1939, when competitive football stopped because of the Second World War, Portugal played in 42 matches, resulting in 13 victories, 7 draws, 22 defeats. Throughout this period they played in the 1928 Olympics, reaching the quarter-finals where they got knocked out by Egypt.

Results
42 matches played:

1920s

1930s

Notes

References

External links
Portugal: Fixtures and Results - FIFA.com
Seleção A Jogos e Resultados FPF
Portugal national football team match results
Portugal - International Results

1920s in Portugal
1930s in Portugal
Portugal national football team results